Lyon attack meaning various serious attacks in an around Lyon, France may refer to:

1980 Turkish Consulate attack in Lyon
2002 Lyon synagogue attack
2015 Saint-Quentin-Fallavier attack near Lyon
2019 Lyon bombing
2019 Lyon stabbings